Maria Australia Navarro de Paz (born 1961) is a Spanish politician from the People's Party and leader of the People's Party of the Canary Islands in the Parliament of the Canary Islands.

Early life
Navarro was born in Las Palmas on 6 February 1961. She holds a law degree and a diploma in marriage law from the National University of Distance Education and received her PhD from the University of Las Palmas de Gran Canaria.

Career
Navarro began her professional career as a lawyer and has her own firm. From 2000 to 2002, she was the Regional Deputy Secretary of Institutional Relations for the People's Party in Canary Islands. Following her election to the Parliament of the Canary Islands from Gran Canaria in 2003, she became the counselor of the Presidency and Justice in the government, a post she held till 2005. Navarro has been the regional deputy of People's Party (PP) in Canary Islands during the regional elections held in 2003, 2007, 2011 and 2015. She currently represents Gran Canaria in the Parliament of the Canary Islands. She is also a member of the National Executive Committee and National Board of PP.

References

1961 births
Living people
21st-century Spanish politicians
21st-century Spanish women politicians
20th-century Spanish lawyers
People from Las Palmas
People's Party (Spain) politicians
Members of the 9th Parliament of the Canary Islands
Members of the 10th Parliament of the Canary Islands
National University of Distance Education alumni
University of Las Palmas de Gran Canaria alumni
Spanish women lawyers